Anna Iliana Maria Gabriella Oxenstierna (born 13 June 1963) is a former Swedish professional golfer. She played on the Ladies European Tour and won the 1989 TEC Players Championship.

Early life
Born into an athletic and golfing family, her father Thure Gabriel Oxenstierna is the architect of Roslagen Golf Club where her brother Alexander later were general manager. Her grandfather Johan Gabriel Oxenstierna won gold in modern pentathlon at the 1932 Summer Olympics in Los Angeles.

Amateur career
Oxenstierna joined the Swedish National Team in 1978 and represented Sweden five times at the European Lady Junior's Team Championship, winning the 1981 and 1984 editions and finishing runner-up in 1982 and 1983. She finished third at the 1983 European Ladies' Team Championship in Waterloo, Belgium, and fourth at the 1985 edition in Stavanger, Norway. She was part of the Swedish team, with Liselotte Neumann and Viveca Hoff, finishing seventh at the 1984 Espirito Santo Trophy in Hong Kong . 

Individually, she won the 1983 Swedish International Stroke Play Championship, at the time the most prestigious amateur tournament in Sweden, She also won the 72-hole tournament Pierre Robert Cup at Falsterbo GC in both 1981 and 1984. She was semi-finalist at the Swedish Matchplay Championship in 1988 and 1994.

Professional career
Oxenstierna turned professional for the 1987 season and played on the Swedish Golf Tour where she was runner-up at the 1987 Delsjö Ladies Open. She finished the 1987 season third on Swedish Golf Tour Order of Merit. The year after she finished second behind Sofia Grönberg. In 1989 she won the IBM Ladies Open and Ängsö Ladies Open. 

Oxenstierna joined the Ladies European Tour in 1989. She won the 1989 TEC Players Championship, to become the fifth Swedish LET winner after Kärstin Ehrnlund, Marie Wennersten, Liselotte Neumann and Sofia Grönberg. In 1990 she was runner-up at the WPG European Tour Classic, 2 strokes behind Tania Abitbol.

Amateur wins
1981 Pierre Robert Cup
1983 Swedish International Stroke Play Championship
1984 Pierre Robert Cup

Professional wins (3)

Ladies European Tour (1)
1989 TEC Players Championship

Swedish Golf Tour (2)
1989 IBM Ladies Open
1989 Ängsö Ladies Open

Source:

Team appearances
Amateur
European Lady Junior's Team Championship (representing Sweden): 1980, 1981 (winners), 1982, 1983, 1984 (winners)
European Ladies' Team Championship (representing Sweden): 1983, 1985
Espirito Santo Trophy (representing Sweden): 1984
Vagliano Trophy (representing the Continent of Europe): 1985

Source:

References

External links

Swedish female golfers
Ladies European Tour golfers
Golfers from Stockholm
1963 births
Living people